Cefn Mably is a district located approximately 6 miles north of Cardiff city centre and 5 miles south-east of Caerphilly.  

It's mostly within the city and county of Cardiff but is also partly within the Caerphilly County Borough.

Notable Buildings
Cefn Mably House is an historic property in the area.

Greyhound racing
The greyhounds that raced at the Cardiff Arms Park and Somerton Park were based at kennels in Cefn Mably.

Fishing
There's 8 fishing lakes, and the Cardiff Angling Centre based at the Cefn Mably Lakes.

Farming
There's an outdoor entertainment venue based at Cefn Mably Farm Park. It contains a soft play barn, child friendly go-karting and digger facilities, a farm shop, hot and cold food for sale, and as the name suggests a working farm.

Drinking
The local pub is The Cefn Mably Arms in the nearby village of Michaelston-y-Fedw.

References

Districts of Cardiff
Populated places in Cardiff
Populated places in Caerphilly County Borough